ACU may refer to:

Computing 
 Address computation unit, another name for address generation unit
 Automatic Client Upgrade, a facility within the Novell Open Enterprise Server

Education 
 Abilene Christian University, a private Christian university located in Abilene, Texas
 Adichunchanagiri University, a private university located in Karnataka, India
 Ajayi Crowther University, a private Christian university located in Oyo, Oyo State Nigeria
 American City University in California or Wyoming
 Arizona Christian University, a private Christian university located in Phoenix, Arizona
 Association of Commonwealth Universities, an association that represents over 480 universities from Commonwealth countries
 Australian Catholic University, Australia's only public Catholic university

Organizations 
 Acu Publishing, an imprint of the German group VDM Publishing devoted to the reproduction of Wikipedia content
 Altura Credit Union, a credit union in California
 American Conservative Union, a political lobbying group in the US
 Arab Customs Union, an organization under the Arab League for a Customs Union between Arab Members of the League
 Asian Clearing Union, an organization that settles international payments between member countries
 Assiniboine Credit Union, a credit union in Manitoba
 Auto-Cycle Union, the governing body of motorcycle sport in Great Britain

Military 
 Assault Craft Unit, military units of the US Navy that specialize in amphibious warfare
 Army Combat Uniform, the combat uniform worn by the US Army, US Air Force, and US Space Force

Transportation 
 Achutupo Airport, Achutupo, Panama (IATA code ACU)
 Auto-Cycle Union, an officially recognised motorcycle governing body of the UK
 Automovil Club del Uruguay, a member of the Fédération Internationale de l'Automobile

Geography 
 Açu, municipality in the state of Rio Grande do Norte, Brazil
 Açu River, another name for the Piranhas River in Brazil
 Pariquera-Açu, a municipality in the state of São Paulo in Brazil
 Superporto do Açu, an industrial port complex in the state of Rio de Janeiro in Brazil

Other uses 
 ACU (Utrecht), a music venue in Utrecht, the Netherlands
 ACU, a codon for the amino acid threonine
 Armored Command Unit, the key unit in the RTS video game Supreme Commander
 Asian Currency Unit, a proposed unit of currency for Asia and Oceania
 Assassin's Creed Unity, a game set during the French Revolution